Kerrier Rural District was a local government division of Cornwall in England, UK, between 1934 and 1974. The rural district was created in 1934 through the abolition of East Kerrier Rural District, Helston Rural District and Redruth Rural District.

In 1974 the district was abolished under the Local Government Act 1972, forming part of the new Kerrier district.

Civil parishes
The civil parishes within the district were:

 Breage
 Budock
 Constantine
 Crowan
 Cury
 Germoe
 Grade–Ruan
 Gunwalloe
 Gweek
 Landewednack
 Mabe
 Manaccan
 Mawgan-in-Meneage
 Mawnan
 Mullion
 Sithney
 St Anthony-in-Meneage
 St Gluvias
 St Keverne
 St Martin-in-Meneage
 Stithians
 Wendron

References

1934 establishments in England
Districts of England abolished by the Local Government Act 1972
Rural districts of England
Local government in Cornwall
History of Cornwall